SRAF can refer to:

 the Social Revolutionary Anarchist Federation, a defunct American anarchist group,
 a word used to refer to "dust" by mulefa in Philip Pullman's His Dark Materials novels,
 the acronym Subresolution Assist Features in Semiconductor device fabrication.